The President's College is a boys' national school in Sri Jayawardenapura Kotte, Sri Lanka. Founded on 4 February 1978, its inauguration was the first official act carried out by President J. R. Jayewardene.

History
The college began with two grades- Lower Kindergarten and Year 1, with  four teachers and 351 students. The school had its first sports meet in 1980, and began offering Advanced Level classes in 1988.

Initially located at Torrington Place, Colombo 7, the school was shifted to its current premises on 21 June 1983. It was given National School status in 1999.
In 2019 February a 25-meter eight lane swimming pool complex was declared open by Minister of Education Akila Viraj Kariyawasam and Minister of Economic Reforms and Public Distribution Dr. Harsha de Silva.

Houses 
The school has a house system comprising four houses. They compete each year to win the Inter-house sports competitions.

  – Gunathilake 
  – Soulbury
  – Jayawardene
  – Gopallawa

Notable alumni

References

External links
 Official website

President's College
National schools in Sri Lanka
Schools in Sri Jayawardenepura Kotte
1978 establishments in Sri Lanka